Michael Burrows is a computer scientist.

Michael Burrows may also refer to:

Michael Burrows (artist), Australian singer-songwriter
Michael Burrows (bishop), Church of Ireland bishop
Mike Burrows (baseball)
Mike Burrows, bicycle designer